Polish rail border crossings as of 2007, abolished cross-border lines are in italic. Year of opening in brackets.

Poland - Russia 

Braniewo - Mamonovo (1853)
Głomno - Bagrationovsk (1866)
Skandawa - Zheleznodorozhny (1871)

Poland - Lithuania 
Trakiszki - Mockava

Poland - Belarus 
Kuźnica − Bruzgi Border Crossing - Highway
Kuźnica − Grodno Border Crossing - Passenger & Freight Railway on the Saint Petersburg–Warsaw Railway
Zubki - Bierestovica 
Siemianówka - Svislach 
Czeremcha - Visoko-Litovsk  
Terespol - Brest 
Wola Uhruska - Tomashovka

Poland - Ukraine 
Dorohusk - Jahodyn (Yahodyn) 
Hrubieszów - Volodymyr-Volynskyi, see Linia Hutnicza Szerokotorowa 
Hrebenne - Rava-Ruska
Werchrata - Rava-Ruska 
Przemyśl - Mostyska
Malhowice - Nizhankovichi
Krościenko - Khyriv

Poland - Slovakia 
Łupków - Medzilaborce (1874), see also Łupków Pass
Muszyna - Plaveč (1876)
Podczerwone - Suchá Hora (1899 - 1975)
Zwardoń - Skalité (1884)

Poland - Czech Republic 

Cieszyn - Český Těšín (1888)
Marklowice - Albrechtice (1914-1931), abolished after enactment of border with Czechoslovakia, only base of bridge across Olza remained
Zebrzydowice - Petrovice u Karviné (1855)
Chałupki (Annaberg) - Bohumín (1848), see Emperor Ferdinand North Railway
Krzanowice - Chuchelná  (1895-1945)
Pilszcz - Opava (1904-1945) 
Głubczyce - Krnov (1873-1945) 
Głuchołazy - Jindřichov ve Slezsku (1875)
Głuchołazy - Mikulovice (1888)
Kałków - Vidnava (1911-1945)
Dziewiętlice - Bernartice (1896-1945)
Międzylesie - Lichkov (1875)
Kudowa Zdrój - Náchod (1945 only)
Tłumaczów - Otovice (1889-1945) 
Mieroszów - Meziměstí (1877) 
Lubawka - Královec (1869), freight only
Jakuszyce - Harrachov (1902-1946, 2010-present), see Izera railway
Mirsk - Jindřichovice pod Smrkem (1902-1945) 
Zawidów - Frýdlant v Čechách (1875), freight only
Bogatynia - Heřmanice (1900-1945), narrow gauge, see Frýdlant-Heřmanice Railway
Kopaczów (Oberullersdorf) - Hrádek nad Nisou (Grottau) (1859-1945), trains currently do not stop on the Polish territory, peage only

Poland - Germany 

Kopaczów (Oberullersdorf) - Zittau (1859-1945), trains currently do not stop on the Polish territory, peage only
Sieniawka (Kleinschönau) - Zittau (-1945), narrow gauge 
Hirschfelde - Krzewina Zgorzelecka - Hagenwerder, border checkpoint at the Krzewina Zgorzelecka railway station
Zawidów - Hagenwerder (1875-1945)
Zgorzelec - Görlitz 
Węgliniec - Horka 
Sanice (Sänitz) - Steinbach (1908-1945), Horka-Przewóz line
Łęknica - Bad Muskau, narrow gauge 
Zasieki - Forst (Lausitz)
Gubin - Guben
Gubinek - Guben
Kunice - Kunitz
Kunowice - Frankfurt
Kostrzyn nad Odrą - Küstrin-Kietz 
Siekierki - Neurüdnitz (1897-1982), former Wriezener Bahn
Szczecin - Tantow
Barnisław - Ladenthin (1899-1945) 
Szczecin - Grambow
Świnoujście - Garz (1894-1945)
Świnoujście - Heringsdorf (1894-1945, 2008-)

Poland - Sweden 
Swinoujscie - Ystad, train ferry, freight only

Unrealised projects 
 Chałupki (Annaberg) - Hlučín

Literature 
 Bernd Kuhlmann, Eisenbahnen über die Oder-Neiße-Grenze, Ritzau KG - Verlag Zeit und Eisenbahn, Pürgen 2004, 
 Miroslav Jelen, Zrušené železniční tratě v Čechách, na Moravě a ve Slezsku, Dokořán 2009,

See also 
 Czech rail border crossings
 History of rail transport in Poland
 Hungarian rail border crossings
 Slovak rail border crossings

External links 
 Polish rail border crossings at the Enthusiast's Guide to Travelling the Railways of Europe

Belarus–Poland border crossings
Rail
Czech Republic–Poland border crossings
Germany–Poland border crossings
Lithuania–Poland border crossings
Poland–Russia border crossings
Poland–Slovakia border crossings
Poland–Ukraine border crossings
Rail transport in Poland